Jambulingam is a 1982 Indian Malayalam-language period film directed by J. Sasikumar, written by Pappanamkodu Lakshmanan, and produced by E. K. Thyagarajan. It is based on the life of outlaw Jambulingam Nadar. The film stars Prem Nazir, Jayabharathi, Adoor Bhasi and Manavalan Joseph in the lead roles. The film has musical score by M. K. Arjunan.

Cast 

Prem Nazir as Jambulingam Nadar
Jayabharathi as Subhadra
Vincent as Muthayah
Adoor Bhasi as Veerappan
Ravikumar as Mukundan Pilla
Sathaar as Moosakutty
T. G. Ravi as Pazhani
C. I. Paul as Ponnayyan
Prathapachandran as Father (Priest)
Manavalan Joseph as Koyikkal Valiy Marthadan Pilla
Unnimary as Sist. Jainamma
Alummoodan as Gopala Pilla
Sankaradi as Anndi
Prathapachandran
G. K. Pillai
Meena
Pushpa
Radhadevi
Stanley
Thodupuzha Radhakrishnan
Varalakshmi

Soundtrack 
The music was composed by M. K. Arjunan and the lyrics were written by Pappanamkodu Lakshmanan and Poovachal Khader.

References

External links 
 

1982 films
1980s Malayalam-language films
Films about outlaws
Indian historical films
History of Kerala on film
1980s historical films
Films set in the British Raj
Biographical films about bandits
Films directed by J. Sasikumar